The Wordtank series is a line of Japanese electronic dictionaries manufactured by Canon.  Although officially only sold in Japan, several of the multi-language models are popular among students of the Japanese language around the world. The ability to change menu display options to English on many of the Wordtank models is cited as a reason for the relatively wide foreign adoption. The ability to highlight an entire Japanese word (as opposed to just one character) and display a hiragana rendering of it is unique to the Wordtank series and is an extremely popular function for advanced learners. This function applies to all Wordtank models. One of the latest Wordtank models, the G70, offers this function for over 400,000 words.

History 
Canon has been manufacturing electronic dictionaries with the "WordTank" name since the late 1980s. Some series were better than others for the non-Japanese user (the mid-nineties IDX series was more usable than models from five years later; later series around 2004-5 are again improved).

ID series – Wordtank
 ID-7000
 ID-7100
 ID-7200 – popular in 1991/92
 ID-8500

ID series expansion cards
 ID-110 Business Conversation Card
 ID-120 Onomancy/Fortune Telling Card
 ID-130 English Conversation/Travel Card
 ID-140 Japanese Definitions Card – for the ID-7000/ID-7100
 ID-150 English/Japanese Dictionary Expansion Card – for ID-7000/ID-7100 (ID-7100 + ID-140 + ID-150 = ID-7200, but cost more)
 ID-160 English Conversation/Business Card
 ID-170 Contemporary Phrases Card
 ID-180 Game of "Go"
 ID-310 English/Japanese Dictionary Expansion Card – for the ID-7200 and ID-8500

IDX series – WORDTANK SUPER
 IDX-6500 – circa 1993–1999 – ROM 16 Mbit
 IDX-7500 – circa 1993–1999
 IDX-9500 – circa 1993–1999 – "64Mbits" – with two card slots. Probably the number one Japanese/English dictionary for non-Japanese during the 1990s.
later:
 IDX-9600 – ROM 68 Mbit
 IDX-9700

IDX series expansion cards
 IDX-510 国語辞典意味カード          for IDX-7500, IDX-6500 (built into IDX-9500)
 IDX-520 英和辞典拡張カード          for IDX-7500, IDX-6500 (built into IDX-9500)
 IDX-530 国語用例時点/漢和拡張カード for IDX-7500, IDX-6500 (built into IDX-9500)
 IDX-540 英和辞典拡張カード          for IDX-7500, IDX-6500 (built into IDX-9500)
 IDX-550 ビジネス用語辞典カード      for IDX-7500, IDX-6500 (built into IDX-9500)
 IDX-560 現代用語辞典カード            for IDX-9500, IDX-7500, IDX-6500
 IDX-570 トラベル英会話カード          for IDX-9500, IDX-7500, IDX-6500

IDC series
 IDC-300
 IDC-310

IDF series – Wordtank Super
 IDF-1000
 IDF-2000E
 IDF-2100
 IDF-2100SP
 IDF-2100VP
 IDF-2200E
 IDF-3000
 IDF-4000
 IDF-4000J
 IDF-4100
 IDF-4500
 IDF-4600

IDJ series
 IDJ-8000 – late 1990s
 IDJ-9000 – late 1990s – smaller display than the IDX-9500, similar dictionaries, but much larger set of kanji compounds (110000 vs 35000)

IDP series
 IDP-50
 IDP-600C
 IDP-600E
 IDP-600J

C series
 C30 – Japanese high school focused
 C35 – Japanese high school focused
 C50
 C55

G series
 G50 – English/Japanese
 G55 – English/Japanese
 G70 – English/Japanese
 G90 – Chinese/English/Japanese

V series (with voice features)
 V30  – Japanese high school focused
 V35  – Japanese high school focused
 V300 – Japanese high school focused
 V70  – Chinese/English/Japanese
 V80  – Chinese/English/Japanese
 V90  – Chinese/English/Japanese
 V903 – Chinese/English/Japanese

M series (with voice features)
 M300 – Japanese high school focused

See also 
 Wordtank G50

External links
 

Japanese dictionaries